The Three Dikgosi Monument is a bronze sculpture located in the Central Business District of Gaborone, Botswana. The statues depict three dikgosi (tribal chiefs): Khama III of the Bangwato, Sebele I of the Bakwena, and Bathoen I of the Bangwaketse. Events are held at the monument such as the 2008 Miss Independence Botswana. A study conducted between January and August 2007 shows that the monument is the most visited tourist destination in Gaborone.

Description

Permission was granted, and meant that the Botswana remained under direct British rule until independence in the 1960s.

Six plinths at the feet of the statues give descriptions of the three chiefs.

History
The monument was inaugurated on 29 September 2005 by Festus Mogae, the president of Botswana at the time. The monument received 800 visitors a day when it first opened.

There are objections to the monument. There was controversy about giving the project to North Korean company Mansudae Overseas Projects instead of a local Botswana construction company. Some ethnic groups in Botswana see the construction of this monument as a proclamation of Tswana people dominance of other groups.

The Adopt a Monument campaign attracted two private companies, GH Holdings and Komatsu Botswana, to help the Botswana National Museum manage the property. The business will provide new rest shelters and signage for the monument.

North Korea in Botswana 
North Korea, known as the Democratic People's Republic of Korea (DPRK), were in support of most African nationalist movements post World War 2, in an attempt to secure more alliances after the Korean War. The first president of Botswana, Seretse Khama, visited Pyongyang ten years after the start of diplomatic ties in 1976. 15 African countries including Botswana have given projects to Mansudae Overseas Projects which is the internation subdivision of a Pyongyang art institute. Such a contract was proposed to Mansudae for the construction of the Three Dikgosi Monument.

See also
 History of Gaborone
 List of tallest statues

References

2005 sculptures
Colossal statues
Bronze sculptures in Botswana
Buildings and structures in Gaborone
Buildings and structures completed in 2005
Landmarks in Gaborone
Mansudae Overseas Projects
2005 in Botswana
Monuments and memorials in Gaborone
Botswana–North Korea relations